Ricardo Jorge de Sousa Pedrosa (born 2 January 1989) is a Portuguese football player who plays for Gondomar.

Club career
He made his professional debut in the Segunda Liga for Boavista on 19 April 2009 in a game against União de Leiria.

References

1989 births
Footballers from Porto
Living people
Portuguese footballers
Boavista F.C. players
Liga Portugal 2 players
C.D. Tondela players
Gondomar S.C. players
Association football defenders